The Proper Time is a 1961 film starring Tom Laughlin. It is also Laughlin's directorial and screenwriting debut.

Plot
Laughlin stars as Mickey Henderson, a student at UCLA with a speech impediment that goes away when he is in contact with girls. He starts a friendship with Sue (Norma Quine), but is seduced by her roommate Doreen (Nira Monsour). He and Doreen soon get engaged, but when he finds she has been cheating on him, he breaks up with her. Sue convinces him to go to a clinic for help with his speech problem.

Cast and crew
Tom Laughlin... Mickey Henderson
Nira Monsour... Doreen
Norma Quine... Sue Dawson
Richard Shannon... Dr. Polery
Alexandre Randal... Mr. Henderson
Constance Davis... Mrs. Henderson

Soundtrack

The jazz score of The Proper Time was composed by Shelly Manne, recorded by his group Shelly Manne & His Men in late 1959 and early 1960, and released on the Contemporary label.

Reception

The Allmusic site rated the album with 3 stars.

Track listing
All compositions by Shelly Manne
 "Drum Solo" - 7:20
 "Blue Stutter" - 4:03
 "The Proper Time" - 4:01
 "Happy Pool" - 4:03
 "The Proper Time" - 2:09
 "Doreen's Blues" - 1:29
 "Exotic Moods" - 2:15
 "Warm Water" - 4:16
 "Doreen's Blues" - 3:16
 "The Proper Time - 1:12
 "Drum Solo" - 0:50
 "Panic" - 1:44
 "Fraternizing" - 1:45
 "Doreen's Blues" - 1:43
 "Fast Blues" - 0:42
 "Piano Trio" - 1:46
 "Doreen's Blues" - 2:15
 "The Proper Time" - 1:20

Personnel
Shelly Manne - drums
Joe Gordon - trumpet
Richie Kamuca - tenor saxophone
Victor Feldman - piano
Monty Budwig - bass

External links

See also
 List of American films of 1970
 List of American films of 1960

References

1960 films
1960 drama films
American black-and-white films
Films directed by Tom Laughlin
American drama films
1960 directorial debut films
1960s English-language films
1960s American films